Jerónimo Bernardo de Quirós, O. Praem. (died 1617) was a Roman Catholic prelate who served as Bishop of Pozzuoli (1604–1617)
and Bishop of Castellammare di Stabia (1601–1604).

Biography
Jerónimo Bernardo de Quirós was born in Spain and ordained a priest in the Order of Canons Regular of Prémontré.
On 28 January 1601, he was consecrated bishop by Antonmaria Sauli, Cardinal-Priest of Santo Stefano al Monte Celio, with Agostino Quinzio, Bishop of Korčula, and Giovanni Battista del Tufo, Bishop of Acerra, serving as co-consecrators. 
On 15 February 1601, he was appointed during the papacy of Pope Clement VIII as Bishop of Castellammare di Stabia.
On 18 August 1604, he was appointed Bishop of Pozzuoli by Pope Clement VIII.
He served as Bishop of Pozzuoli until his death in 1617.

References

External links and additional sources

17th-century Italian Roman Catholic bishops
Bishops appointed by Pope Clement VIII
1617 deaths
Premonstratensian bishops